Erik Fetter (born 5 April 2000) is a Hungarian cyclist, who currently rides for UCI ProTeam .

Major results
2017
 1st  National Junior XCO Championships
2018
 Summer Youth Olympics
1st  Short track cross-country
6th Road race
 1st  National Junior XCO Championships
2021
 1st  Time trial, National Road Championships
 1st Stage 4 Tour du Limousin
 4th Road race, UEC European Under-23 Road Championships
2022
 1st  Time trial, National Road Championships
 2nd Overall Okolo jižních Čech
 4th Road race, UEC European Under-23 Road Championships

Grand Tour general classification results timeline

References

External links

2000 births
Living people
Hungarian male cyclists
Cyclists from Budapest
Cyclists at the 2018 Summer Youth Olympics